Kenneth Brian Day (19 May 1935 – 19 January 1971) was an English cricketer.

Day was a right-handed batsman and wicket-keeper.  He made his first-class debut for the Marylebone Cricket Club against Cambridge University at Lord's in 1958, though he wasn't called upon to bat during the match, he did however take a single catch.

Having played for the Middlesex Second XI since 1955, Day made his first-class debut for Middlesex in 1959, making two appearances against Kent and Cambridge University.  He again wasn't required to bat in either of these matches, while behind the stumps he took a total of three catches and made four stumpings.  In his Second XI career for the county, which spanned from 1955 to 1960, he never once reached double figures and was considered a genuine number eleven batsman.

He died following a fall at his Fulham home, on 19 January 1971 aged 35.

References

External links
Kenneth Day at ESPNcricinfo
Kenneth Day at CricketArchive

1935 births
1971 deaths
People from Hendon
English cricketers
Marylebone Cricket Club cricketers
Middlesex cricketers
Wicket-keepers